Oblivion, POV & Some Trivia is a Rhino Records compilation album by Utopia that includes all of the tracks from the original Utopia albums Oblivion and P.O.V., and the song "Man of Action," which was originally the b-side to the U.K. single "Mated" and a bonus track on the cassette and CD versions of P.O.V.. It also includes the non-regular-album tracks, "Fix Your Gaze" and "Monument" from the compilation album Trivia.

Track listing

All songs written by Utopia (Roger Powell, Todd Rundgren, Kasim Sulton, and John Wilcox).

Disc one
"Itch in My Brain" – 4:30
"Love With a Thinker" – 3:15
"Bring Me My Longbow" – 3:18
"If I Didn't Try" – 4:10
"Too Much Water" – 4:40
"Maybe I Could Change" – 4:09
"Crybaby" – 4:20
"Welcome to My Revolution" – 5:04
"Winston Smith Takes It on the Jaw" – 3:18
"I Will Wait" – 4:44
"Fix Your Gaze" – 4:31

Disc two
"Play This Game" – 4:11
"Style" – 4:14
"Stand for Something" – 3:48
"Secret Society" – 4:16
"Zen Machine" – 4:07
"Mated" – 3:55
"Wildlife" – 3:38
"Mimi Gets Mad" – 3:44
"Mystified" – 5:20
"More Light" – 3:54
"Man of Action" – 3:42
"Monument" – 5:41

Personnel
 Roger Powell – keyboards, vocals
 Todd Rundgren – guitar, vocals
 Kasim Sulton – bass, vocals
 John "Willie" Wilcox – drums, vocals

Credits
 Brett Bayne – project assistant
 Murray Brenman – artwork
 Lynn Goldsmith – photography
 Bill Inglot – remastering
 Brett Milano – liner notes
 Ken Owen – project assistant
 Gary Peterson – reissue producer
 Coco Shinomiya – art direction
 John Wagman – design

References

External links
 

1996 compilation albums
Todd Rundgren albums
Albums produced by Todd Rundgren
Rhino Records compilation albums
Utopia (band) albums